James Brien McIlroy (28 July 1939 – 1995) was a Scottish footballer who played as an outside left, primarily for Kilmarnock, with whom he won the Scottish Football League in 1964–65; it was his goal in the decisive match against Heart of Midlothian which won Killie the championship on goal average.

McIlroy is Kilmarnock's third-highest goalscorer of all time, and the annual club award for seasonal top scorer is named in his honour.

References

1939 births
1995 deaths
Date of death missing 
Footballers from Glasgow
Association football outside forwards
Scottish footballers
Kilmarnock F.C. players
Aberdeen F.C. players
Rangers F.C. players
Third Lanark A.C. players
Kirkintilloch Rob Roy F.C. players
Scottish Junior Football Association players
Scottish Football League players